USS Compel (AM-162) was an Admirable-class minesweeper built for the U.S. Navy during World War II. She was built to clear minefields in offshore waters, and served the Navy in the Pacific Ocean. Compel was awarded one battle star for World War II service.

She was launched January 1943 by Willamette Iron and Steel Works, Portland, Oregon; and commissioned 8 April 1944.

World War II Pacific Ocean operations 
Compel sailed from San Francisco, California, 22 June 1944 as escort for a tug group which arrived in Pearl Harbor 3 July. Compel swept mines off French Frigate Shoals from 6 August to 15 August, then escorted a convoy to Eniwetok, arriving 5 September to assume antisubmarine patrol.

From 24 October 1944 until the end of the war Compel operated at Eniwetok, Ulithi, the Palaus, Saipan, Guam, and Majuro. She acted as convoy escort, minesweeper, harbor entrance control vessel, and experimental ship for minesweeping equipment. Taking departure from Saipan 29 August 1945 Compel sailed via Okinawa to clear the approaches to Wakayama, Japan, of mines. Moving to Nagoya for similar duty, she served there until 20 November when she sailed for San Francisco, California, arriving 16 December.

Postwar decommissioning  
She was placed out of commission in reserve at San Diego, California, 12 June 1946. Compel was reclassified MSF-162, 7 February 1955. She was sold on 26 August 1960.

Awards 
Compel was awarded one battle star for World War II service.

References

External links
 Dictionary of American Naval Fighting Ships
 NavSource Online: Mine Warfare Vessel Photo Archive - Compel (MSF 162) - ex-AM-162 - ex-AMc-139

Admirable-class minesweepers
World War II mine warfare vessels of the United States
Ships built in Portland, Oregon
1943 ships